Dolna may refer to:

Dolna, Strzelce County, a village in Gmina Leśnica, Poland
Dolna, Strășeni, a commune in Strășeni District, Moldova
Dolna (film), a 1990 Bangladeshi film

See also